Paul Wesley Felix (born July 21, 1983) is an American sprinter who specialises in the 100 and 200 metres. He attended the University of Southern California from 2002 to 2005, where he was the Pac-10 200 metres champion in 2003 and 2004. He was also the Pac 10 champion in the 100m in 2005 in the time of 10.24 (wind: -0.1 m/s).

He is the older brother of Olympic medalist Allyson Felix.  Wes now acts as the agent for his sister.

Personal best

References

External links

Official bio at USC

1983 births
Living people
American male sprinters
University of Southern California alumni